Dejvid Sinani (born 2 April 1993) is a footballer who plays as a midfielder for F91. Born in Serbia, he is a Luxembourg international.

Club career
Sinani started his career with Luxembourgian side Differdange, helping them win the 2013–14 Luxembourg Cup and 2014–15 Luxembourg Cup. In 2018, he signed for Fola in Luxembourg, helping them win the league. In 2021, Sinani signed for Luxembourgian top flight club F91, helping them win the league.

International career
Sinani played six times for the Luxembourg U21 team between 2013 and 2014. He made his senior debut for D'Roud Léiwen in a friendly against Hungary on 17 November 2022 appearing in the starting lineup alongside his brother.

Personal life
He is the older brother of Luxembourg international Danel Sinani.

Career statistics

References

External links
 

1993 births
Living people